Seyed Ahmad Mousavi is an Iranian footballer who plays right back.

Club career

Pas Hamedan
Mousavi started his career with Pas Hamedan and made 15 appearances for them in 2013–14 Azadegan League.

Rah Ahan
He joined Rah Ahan in summer 2014 and made his debut for them in first fixture of 2014–15 Iran Pro League against Esteghlal.

Club career statistics

References

External links
 Ahmad Mousavi  at IranLeague

Living people
People from Dorud
Iranian footballers
1992 births
Rah Ahan players
PAS Hamedan F.C. players
Esteghlal F.C. players
Association football fullbacks